Dolores Cristina (born January 10, 1949) is a former Maltese politician who served in a number of ministerial positions under a number of Nationalist Governments.

Early life and education

Cristina was born in Senglea. She graduated from the Royal University of Malta with a Bachelor of Arts (Hons.) degree in 1971 and held teaching posts in History and English at Secondary and Post-Secondary levels.

Political career

Cristina, a member of the Nationalist Party, stood as a candidate in the 1996 general election. She briefly became Mayor of Swieqi in April 1998 before being elected to Parliament from the 10th District in the September 1998 general election.

Cristina was re-elected to Parliament from the 9th District in the April 2003 general election. Subsequently she was appointed as Parliamentary Secretary within the Ministry of Social Policy, with a special focus on Social Housing and Gender Equality. She was later appointed as Minister for the Family and Social Solidarity in a cabinet reshuffle on 23 March 2004, with a portfolio including Social Policy, Family Policy, Child Policy, Solidarity Services, Social Security, Social Housing and Equality.

After the Nationalist victory in the March 2008 general election, Cristina was appointed as Minister for Education and Culture, replacing the unelected former Minister Louis Galea.

Dolores Cristina acted as the President of Malta on 19 March 2013. She assumed this role in absence of The President of Malta, H.E. Dr. George Abela, when the latter led a delegation to the Vatican City, to assist to the Papal inauguration of Pope Francis.

References

1949 births
Living people
Members of the House of Representatives of Malta
Nationalist Party (Malta) politicians
People from Senglea
Government ministers of Malta
Women government ministers of Malta
20th-century Maltese women politicians
20th-century Maltese politicians
21st-century Maltese women politicians
21st-century Maltese politicians